The women's K-1 500 metres was a competition in canoeing at the 1956 Summer Olympics.  The K-1 event is raced by single-person canoe sprint kayaks. Heat and finals took place on December 1.

Medalists

Heats
The ten competitors first raced in three heats.  The top four finishers in each heat moved directly to the final.

Final

Dementyeva false-started once, then won the event by two meters after spurting to the lead after the start. Fifth-place finisher Cochrane never trained with or competed against women prior to the Olympics.

References

1956 Summer Olympics official report. pp. 409–10.
Sports-reference.com women's 1956 K-1 500 m results.
Wallechinsky, David and Jaime Loucky (2008). "Canoeing: Women's Kayak Singles 500 Meters". In The Complete Book of the Summer Olympics: 2008 Edition. London: Aurum Press Limited. pp. 490–1.

Women's K-1 500
Olympic
Women's events at the 1956 Summer Olympics